Banata Tchale Sow is a Chadian economist and politician.

Career
From June 2009 to February 2013, Sow was a technical advisor to the Prime Minister of Chad for microfinance and sustainable development.

From February 2013 to October 2013, Sow was a technical advisor for Economic and Budgetary Affairs at the Presidency of the Republic.

From October 2013 to April 2014, Sow held the post of Minister of Microcredits for the Promotion of Women and Youth.

From April 2014 to August 2015, Sow was the Secretary of State for Finance and Budget in charge of microfinance.

From November 2015 to August 2016, Sow was the Secretary General of the Court of Auditors.

From August 2016 to February 2017, Sow was the Secretary of State for Infrastructure and Opening up.

From February 5, 2017, to November 21, 2017, Sow was the Secretary of State for Finance and Budget.

As of June 2018, Sow was the Chief of Staff to the President of Chad.

References

Living people
Chadian economists
Government ministers of Chad
21st-century Chadian women politicians
21st-century Chadian politicians
Women economists
Year of birth missing (living people)